Noel Anthony Clarke (born 6 December 1975) is a British actor and filmmaker. Rising to prominence for playing Mickey Smith in Doctor Who (2005–2010), he received critical acclaim for writing, directing and starring as Sam Peel in the films Kidulthood (2006), Adulthood (2008) and Brotherhood (2016) and for starring, co-created and writing Bulletproof (2018–2021), which both depicted black working-class characters in London.

Making his film debut in I'll Sleep When I'm Dead (2003), Clarke has gone on to star in  films including Centurion (2010), 4.3.2.1. (2010), Fast Girls (2012), Storage 24 (2012), Star Trek Into Darkness (2013), I Am Soldier (2014), The Anomaly (2014), I Kill Giants (2017), Mute (2018), 10x10 (2018), The Corrupted (2019), Twist (2021) and SAS: Red Notice (2021), some of which he also wrote, directed or produced.

In 2015, Clarke founded the company Unstoppable Film and Television with friend and fellow actor Jason Maza, and they have written, directed and starred in several productions.

Clarke won the Laurence Olivier Award for Most Promising Performer in 2003, the BAFTA Orange Rising Star Award in 2009, and received the BAFTA Outstanding British Contribution to Cinema Award in 2021. The latter was suspended on 29 April 2021, however, in the wake of allegations of verbal abuse, bullying, and sexual misconduct by 26 different women.

Early life
Clarke was born in Notting Hill, West London, to Trinidadian parents Gemma (née Clarke), a nurse and part-time laundrette worker, and Alphaeus Baptiste "Alf" Clarke, a carpenter. He has an older half-brother. His parents divorced shortly after he was born, and he was brought up by his mother on a council estate in Ladbroke Grove where his mother still lives. In 2018, when appearing on the BBC genealogy series Who Do You Think You Are?, Clarke discovered that his maternal great-grandparents emigrated to Trinidad from Saint Vincent, while his paternal grandmother, Menelvia Clarke (née Bedeau), emigrated there from Grenada.

Clarke studied Media at the University of North London, and worked as a personal trainer before going on to take acting classes at London's Actors Centre.

Career

2001–2005: Early career in television and stage
Clarke has had recurring television roles as Wyman Norris in the revived series of Auf Wiedersehen, Pet (2002–2004) and as Mickey Smith in the first two series of the revival of the BBC science-fiction series Doctor Who (2005–2006). He later became the series' first black companion in the episode "School Reunion", and reprised his role as Mickey in the episode "Journey's End" in 2008 and in 2010 in "The End of Time" Part 2, and also starred in the Doctor Who audio series Dalek Empire: The Fearless, which was released from September to December 2007.

Clarke's other television work includes appearances in Casualty and Metrosexuality. He also wrote "Combat" which is an episode of the Doctor Who spin-off series Torchwood, and West 10 LDN, a pilot for BBC Three about kids on a rough housing estate. Clarke has also acted on the stage, and won the Laurence Olivier Award for "Most Promising Newcomer" in 2003 for his performance in the play Where Do We Live at the Royal Court Theatre.

2006–2012: Emerging success as an actor and filmmaker
Clarke began his filmmaking career when he wrote the screenplay for the film Kidulthood, a film about a group of teenagers growing up in Ladbroke Grove, West London. Clarke wrote the film based on his own experiences growing in Ladbroke Grove, which he began developing with director Menhaj Huda and producer George Isaac. Made on a budget of £560,000, Kidulthood was released theatrically on 3 March 2006, earned £1,209,319 during the opening weekend of its release and received praise and some controversy for its depection of teenage life in London. 

In 2008, following the success of Kidulthood, Clarke was hired to write and star in Adulthood, where he also made his directoral debut. On directing his first film, Clarke described his experience: "Directing for the first time was definitely a challenge and tiring at times. It was a steep learning curve and if you're willing to do stuff and go with it, then it pays off." Adulthood grossed £1,203,319 during its UK opening weekend, with an overall gross of £6 million, becoming the second-highest grossing British film of 2008.

In 2009, Clarke was awarded a BAFTA award in the category of Orange Rising Star Award. As a result of the success of Kidulthood, Adulthood, and his BAFTA win, he was ranked at number 83 in the MediaGuardian 100, an annual ranking of media people in The Guardian. In 2010, he signed a deal with Icon.

Following his BAFTA win, Clarke appeared in low-budget and commercially unsuccessful British films such as Heartless, Doghouse and Sex & Drugs & Rock & Roll (all 2009) and Centurion (2010).

In 2010, Clarke turned to mainstream films by writing and co-directing 4.3.2.1., a heist movie about four feisty girls who get caught up with a diamond theft heist. Starring Emma Roberts, Tamsin Egerton, Ophelia Lovibond, Shanika-Warren Markland, Mandy Patinkin, Helen McCrory, Kevin Smith, Susannah Fielding, Camille Coduri and Clarke, 4.3.2.1. received generally mixed to negative reviews and was a box office bomb. 

Following 4.3.2.1., Clarke continued to either co-write or star in more mainstream British films including Fast Girls, a sports film about two women and their race and personal differences as they become professional sprinters and join the British relay team for a World Championship event, and Storage 24, a science fiction-horror about  a group of people become trapped inside a storage facility with a highly unwelcome guest. Both films were released in 2012 to generally mixed-to-positive reviews.

2013–2016: Continued moderate success
After an uncredited and deleted role in the 2012 Marvel Comics Ghost Rider: Spirit of Vengeance, in 2013, Clarke played Thomas Harewood, a family man with a wife and a young daughter, in Star Trek Into Darkness. The film was released on 15 May 2013.

In 2015, Clarke created a short-lived superhero series, The Troop, for Titan Comics. The first issue was released in December 2015, and received critical acclaim.

After years of reluctance, in 2016, Clarke returned to write, direct, co-produce and star in Brotherhood, a sequel to Adulthood and the third and final installment in his Hood Trilogy. The film was screened in the Special Presentations section at the 2016 Toronto International Film Festival and was released on 29 August 2016 to mixed-to-positive reviews from critics. It was also a box-office success, earning £1.98m in its opening week for an overall gross of over £28.7 million in the UK, becoming the highest-grossing film in the trilogy.

2018–2021: Venture in television

Bulletproof
In 2018, Clarke co-created, co-wrote and co-starred in the Sky One police procedural series Bulletproof, alongside Ashley Walters. The series follows NCA detectives, and best friends, Aaron Bishop (Clarke) and Ronnie Pike Jr. (Walters), who investigate some of the country's most dangerous criminals, including traffickers, drug dealers and armed robbers, whilst being overseen by their boss Sarah Tanner (Lindsey Coulson). 

Inspired by the film Bad Boys, the series was left in development hell for several years prior as people felt that Britain wasn't for a show about two black police officers. The first season of Bulletproof was first broadcast on Sky One on 15 May 2018 to positive reviews and successful ratings. The series was followed by a second season consisting of seven episodes was confirmed. Sky TV announced in December 2019 that the second series would air on 20 March 2020. Further, in August 2019 it was announced that a new three-part special would be broadcast in Autumn 2020. The special began airing on 20 January 2021, with all episodes released for on-demand viewing. It sees Bishop and Pike journeying to South Africa to investigate the country's criminal underworld.

On 15 January 2021, five days before the third series premiered, Bulletproof was renewed for a fourth series. The series was set to consist of eight episodes; filming had been scheduled to begin later in the year. However, following allegations against Clarke in late April 2021 of sexual misconduct and bullying, filming was suspended, and makers Vertigo said they would investigate whether any of the allegations related to their productions. In May 2021, the series was officially cancelled by Sky One.

Viewpoint
In 2021, Clarke starred in and executively-produced the ITV police procedural miniseries Viewpoint, which aired on ITV nightly from 26 April 2021. However, prior to the fourth episode's broadcast on 29 April, The Guardian reported that Clarke was the subject of allegations of sexual harassment and intimidation by 20 women, which he denied. Although the episode aired as planned, the finale of Viewpoint was pulled from its intended broadcast on 30 April, and was replaced by a new episode of It'll Be Alright on the Night. The final episode was instead released onto ITV's on-demand platform, ITV Hub (and STV Player), alongside previous episodes, for 48 hours.  The episodes were streamed without advertisements.

Personal life
Clarke lives in London with his wife, Iris Da-Silva, with whom he has four children. 

In 2015, Clarke's former co-star Adam Deacon was banned by West London Magistrates' Court from contacting Clarke after Deacon was found guilty of harassment without violence due to sending a "barrage" of abusive social media messages. The pair reportedly fell out in 2010, and among the messages he sent out, Deacon also accused Clarke of "bullying" him and "sabotaging" his career.

Sexual misconduct allegations
On 29 April 2021, The Guardian published allegations by 20 women of verbal abuse, bullying, and sexual harassment by Clarke; by the following day, The Guardian had spoken to a further six women with allegations against Clarke. One of the accusations is that he filmed a nude audition by Jahannah James without her consent and showed it to a producer who worked for him. The same producer accuses him of exposing his genitals to her in the back of a car and groping her in a lift the next day. The actress Jing Lusi, who appeared with Clarke in the film SAS: Red Notice alleges that he sexually propositioned and threatened her. Other women allege that Clarke pressured them to perform sex scenes nude, and grew angry if they refused.

In response to the claims, BAFTA announced it was suspending both his membership and his Outstanding British Contribution to Cinema Award. The following day, ITV announced that it would not broadcast the final episode of Viewpoint, in which Clarke starred, and international distribution of the series was suspended. Industry Entertainment declared they would no longer be representing Clarke and Sky immediately halted his involvement in any future productions.

Clarke issued a statement through the PA news agency denying "any sexual misconduct or criminal wrongdoing" but conceding that one allegation was true, that he had repeatedly made remarks on the buttocks of an employee, Helen Atherton, who was art director on Brotherhood. Clarke apologised and said he was seeking professional help "to change for the better".

On 7 May 2021, Clarke was accused by five more women of sexual harassment on the set of Doctor Who and at a promotional event relating to the show. One of these accusations was made by an anonymous actress who said that Clarke "made advances on me" and asked her regularly if she "wanted a piece of his dark chocolate". She explained that when she rejected his advances, Clarke badmouthed her to people in the industry. Clarke denied these allegations. Sky and production company Vertigo Films said they would no longer proceed with further series of Bulletproof.

On 27 March 2022, it was revealed that Metropolitan Police had decided not to proceed investigating the sexual harassment claims against Clarke.

On 7 September 2022, it was reported that Clarke had dropped the legal action he had taken against BAFTA following its suspension of his membership and honorary award.

Filmography

Film

Television

Short film

Theatre 
 2003: Where Do We Live at the Jerwood Theatre Upstairs at the Royal Court

Awards and nominations

References

External links

 
 

1975 births
Noel Clarke sexual misconduct allegations
Male actors from London
English male film actors
English film directors
English people of Grenadian descent
English people of Saint Vincent and the Grenadines descent
English people of Trinidad and Tobago descent
English screenwriters
English male screenwriters
English male television actors
English television writers
Living people
Black British male actors
BAFTA Rising Star Award winners
Alumni of the University of North London
People from Notting Hill
20th-century English male actors
21st-century English male actors
English film producers
British male television writers
Black British filmmakers
Sexual harassment in the United Kingdom